Wesmont is a commuter rail station on the New Jersey Transit (NJT) Bergen County Line, located in Wood-Ridge, New Jersey, positioned between Garfield and Rutherford stations and two stops away from Secaucus Junction. Wesmont opened on May 15, 2016, as part of the $400 million Wesmont Station development project, surrounding a former Curtiss-Wright aircraft engine factory. The station is the newest in the NJ Transit Rail Operations network. The station and tracks are located along Wood-Ridge's boundary with neighboring Wallington, although the platform can only be reached from the Wood-Ridge side. Wesmont is one of two rail stations in Wood-Ridge; the Pascack Valley Line serves the older Wood-Ridge station.

History
NJT announced plans for the station on June 11, 2008, with the overall re-development of the  site expected to include over 700 housing units,  of retail and office space, a middle school and a community center. Construction was scheduled to begin in 2009, with the station originally due to open in 2011. However, PCB contamination of the land required extensive environmental cleanup, after previous work for asbestos removal. 

The first residential apartments opened on February 14, 2012, and the train station had its official groundbreaking on March 11, 2014. The station quietly opened on May 15, 2016, without a formal ceremony.

The station cost $18 million to build, with $6 million from NJ Transit and $12 million from Somerset Development. The station was built by Anselmi & DeCicco, Inc. of Maplewood, NJ and has a 216-space parking lot, but only a 28-space temporary lot was available at the station's opening. Pedestrian and cycle routes are being developed to improve station access from nearby residential areas.

Station layout
The station has one high-level island platform connected to the street by a walkway over the northbound track.

See also

List of NJ Transit stations

References

External links

NJT - Wesmont Station Opening Information

NJ Transit Rail Operations stations
Railway stations in Bergen County, New Jersey
Wood-Ridge, New Jersey
Railway stations in the United States opened in 2016